The second season of the reality television series Prince Charming premiered on October 12, 2020 streaming on premium sector of RTL+ and began airing on television on October 26, 2020 on VOX. The second Prince Charming was 29-year-old marketing manager Alexander Schäfer from Frankfurt.

The season ended on December 14, 2020 (RTL+) and on December 21, 2020 (VOX), and Lauritz Hofmann was initially named the winner. In the reunion, Schäfer and Hofmann announced that they didn't become a couple, after filming the final.

Filming
Like in the first season, also the second season of Prince Charming was shot in Greece in Crete in August 2020.

Contestants
This season was featured 20 contestants.

Contestant Progress

 The contestant had to give up his tie and was eliminated.
 The contestant was the runner up.
 The contestant won Prince Charming.

Episodes

Episode 1
Original airdate:RTL+: VOX:

Episode 2
Original airdate:RTL+: VOX:

Episode 3
Original airdate:RTL+: VOX:

Episode 4
Original airdate:RTL+: VOX:

Episode 5
Original airdate:RTL+: VOX:

Episode 6
Original airdate:RTL+: VOX:

Episode 7
Original airdate:RTL+: VOX:

Episode 8
Original airdate:RTL+: VOX:

Episode 9
Original airdate:RTL+: VOX:

Episode 10 - The Big Reunion
Original airdate:RTL+: VOX: 

In The Big Reunion (German: Das große Wiedersehen) around three months after the shooting in Crete, this year's Prince Charming, Alexander Schäfer, and some of the single men who courted him meet again for the first time and review what has happened since the last episode. In addition to Prince Alexander, guests in the studio are the winner Lauritz, the runner-up Vincent and the candidates Gino, Andrea, David, Michael, Jan and Joachim. The host was Lola Weippert.

Spin-off shows

Podcast

References

2020 German television seasons